T. Meena Kumari (born 1951) is a retired high court judge of India. She was the first Chief Justice of Meghalaya High Court. She previously served as the judge of Andhra Pradesh High Court and Patna High Court.

On her appointment as first Chief Justice of Meghalaya in 2013, she said her first priority would be to set up Fast-Track Courts in the state, as well as to understand the problems of the region and deal with pending cases. However, she was only in post for five months. After her retirement as Meghalaya Chief Justice in August 2013, she was appointed Chairperson of the Tamil Nadu State Human Rights Commission in December 2014. The post had been vacant since 2011.

Whilst serving as a judge in the Andhra Pradesh High Court, she was involved in the case of T. Muralidhar Rao vs State of Andhra Pradesh 2010 as a member of the seven judge bench. The case dealt with religion-based reservations, specifically relating to reservations for backward class Muslims. While agreeing with the majority view, which struck down the quota, Justice T. Meena Kumari articulated a separate judgement.

She completed her law degree from Osmania University, Hyderabad, Andhra Pradesh. She is the granddaughter of late violinist Padmashree Venkateswamy Naidu.

References 

Living people
1951 births
Judges of the Andhra Pradesh High Court
Judges of the Patna High Court
Chief Justices of the Meghalaya High Court
Women educators from Meghalaya
Educators from Meghalaya
20th-century Indian judges
20th-century Indian women judges
21st-century Indian judges
21st-century Indian women judges